The silent dormouse (Graphiurus surdus) is a species of rodent in the family Gliridae. It is found in Cameroon, Democratic Republic of the Congo, Equatorial Guinea, and Gabon. Its natural habitat is subtropical or tropical moist lowland forests.

References
Holden, M. E.. 2005. Family Gliridae. pp. 819–841 in Mammal Species of the World a Taxonomic and Geographic Reference. D. E. Wilson and D. M. Reeder eds. Johns Hopkins University Press, Baltimore.
 Schlitter, D. 2004.  Graphiurus surdus.   2006 IUCN Red List of Threatened Species.   Downloaded on 29 July 2007.

Graphiurus
Mammals described in 1912
Taxonomy articles created by Polbot